The Battle of Pune took place on 25 October 1802 near Pune between the rival factions of the Maratha empire. The forces of the Scindia (Shinde) and the Peshwa Bajirao II were attacked by the Holkars.  While the British East India Company was not involved in the battle, its outcome and aftermath led to the Second Anglo-Maratha War.

In May 1802, Maharaja Yashwantrao Holkar with 20,000 men marched towards Pune to solve the disputes. He conquered Sendhwa, Chalisgaon, Dhulia, Malegaon, Parol, Ner, Ahmednagar, Rahuri, Nashik, Sinnar, Dungargaon, Jamgaon, Pharabagh, Gardond, Pandharpur, Kurkumb, Narayangaon, Baramati, Purandhar, Saswad, Moreshwar, Thalner, and Jejuri.

On Sunday, 25 October 1802, on the festival of Diwali, Yashwantrao Holkar defeated the combined armies of Scindia and Peshwa which was around 25,000 at Hadapsar, near Pune. The battle took place at Ghorpadi, Banwadi and Hadapsar. Maharaja Yashwantrao Holkar is said to have ordered his army not to attack first and wait until 25 cannonballs were fired from other side; when the 25 cannonballs were fired, Maharaja Yashwantrao Holkar ordered his army to attack. As soon as he won the war, he ordered his army not to harm the civilians of Pune.

The Peshwa, when he learned that he was defeated, fled from Pune with 2000 men via Parvati, Wadgaon to Sinhagad. Maharaja Yashwantrao Holkar asked the Peshwa to return to Pune. 

On 27 October 1802, Peshwa Bajirao (II), along with Chimnaji, Baloji, and Kunjir along with some soldiers of Scindia, went to Raigad and spent one month in Virwadi. He then went to Suwarnadurgh, and on 01/12/1802, went to Bassein via a ship named Harkuyan. The British offered him enticements to sign the Subsidiary Treaty in return for the throne. After deliberating for over a month, and after threats that his brother would otherwise be recognised as Peshwa, Bajirao (II) signed the treaty, surrendering his residual sovereignty and allowing the English to put him on the throne at Pune. This Treaty of Bassein was signed on 31 December 1802.

Panse, Purandhare, and some other Maratha Sardars had requested the Peshwa to return to Pune and have a dialogue with the Holkars. Even Chimanaji was against signing a treaty with British.

After conquering Pune, Yashwantrao Holkar took the administration in his hands and appointed his men. He freed Moroba Phadnawis, brother of Nana Phadnavis, Phadke, etc., who were imprisoned by Bajirao (II).

He appointed Amrutrao as the Peshwa and went to Indore on 13 March 1803. He kept his 10,000 men in pune for the protection of new Peshwa. The British reinsted Bajirao (II) as the Peshwa at Pune on 13 May 1803, but soon the Peshwa realised that he was only a nominal peshwa and that British had taken total control.

See also
Yashwantrao Holkar
Battle of Bharatpur

References

Mountstuart Elphinstone, Territories conquered from the Peishwa
James Grant Duff (1826), History of the Marathas (Vol. III, Chap X,pg 206-210)-  London
 A. Kolhatkar, Toronto, Canada Private Communication
( Relevant information within the above posting)

Poona
Poona 1802
Poona
History of Pune
1802 in India
October 1802 events
Events in Pune